The Detroit Sunday Journal was a weekly tabloid newspaper published from November 19, 1995, through November 21, 1999, in Detroit, Michigan, in the United States by striking workers from The Detroit News and The Detroit Free Press. It was pro-union, and focused on labor issues as well as local news.  There were just over 200 editions published and circulation for most editions was 40,000-60,000, being made available through the mail and in stores and corner boxes throughout Southeast Michigan. Originally intended to merely shed light on the Detroit Newspaper Strike and other labor issues, it became one of the longest-running temporary newspapers ever.

There were calls for it to become a daily paper in the Detroit area, given its pro-union focus during a time that people considered the leading periodicals, The Detroit News and The Detroit Free Press to be anti-union. Although the newspaper strike formally ended in February, 1997, the Detroit Sunday Journal continued to be published through November 21, 1999 as union workers were gradually rehired at The Detroit News and The Detroit Free Press.

See also
 Madison Press Connection

References

Further reading
 Mark Fitzgerald, "Voice for Strikers," Editor & Publisher, vol. 129, no. 11 (March 16, 1996), pg. 14.
 Steve Franklin, "Detroit's New Newspaper," Columbia Journalism Review, vol. 34, no. 5 (Jan.-Feb. 1996), pg. 17.
 Paul Gargaro, "Sunday Journal Eyes Fewer Copies to Cut Costs," Crain's Detroit Business, vol. 13, no. 10 (March 10, 1997), pg. 30.
 Cynthia Hanson and Abraham McLaughlin, "The Detroit Sunday Journal, Produced by Striking Workers," Christian Science Monitor, vol. 87, no. 249 (Nov. 20, 1995), pg. 2.
 Cynthia Hanson and Abraham McLaughlin, "Media Heroes Sung," Editor & Publisher, vol. 130, no. 46 (Nov. 15, 1997), pg. 3.
 Steve Raphael, "Journal Working to Publish No More," Crain's Detroit Business, vol. 12, no. 5 (Jan. 29, 1996), pg. 3.
 Steve Raphael, "Strikers Starting Tabloid," Crain's Detroit Business, vol. 11, no. 46 (Nov. 13, 1995), pg. 1.
 Chris Rhomberg, The Broken Table: The Detroit Newspaper Strike and the State of American Labor. New York: Russell Sage Foundation, 2012.
 James L. Tyson, "Paper-and-Ink Insurgency Hits Detroit," Christian Science Monitor, vol. 88, no. 33 (Jan. 12, 1996), pg. 1.

External links
The Detroit Sunday Journal at Wayne State University Library contains the full run of the Detroit Sunday Journal, which was published by the striking union works for the duration of the strike, in a digitized, searchable format.

Defunct newspapers published in Michigan
Defunct weekly newspapers
Newspapers published in Detroit
Publications established in 1995
Publications disestablished in 1999
Labor disputes in Michigan
Workers' rights organizations
Newspaper labor disputes in the United States
1995 establishments in Michigan
1999 disestablishments in Michigan
Strike paper